"Shamrocks and Shenanigans (Boom Shalock Lock Boom)" is a song written and performed by American hip hop group House of Pain. It was released in 1992 through Tommy Boy Records as the second single from their debut studio album, Fine Malt Lyrics.

Charts

References

External links 

1992 songs
1992 singles
House of Pain songs
Tommy Boy Records singles